Nopphon Ponkam (born: July 19, 1996), simply known as Pae, is a Thai professional footballer who plays as a defensive midfielder for Thai League 1 club Nakhon Ratchasima.

International career
In August 2017, he won the Football at the 2017 Southeast Asian Games with Thailand U23. In January 2018, he was in the squad of Thailand U23 for 2018 AFC U-23 Championship at China.

Honours

International
Thailand U-23
 Sea Games  Gold Medal (1); 2017

References

External links
https://int.soccerway.com/players/nopphon-phonkam/382739/

1996 births
Living people
Nopphon Ponkam
Nopphon Ponkam
Association football midfielders
Nopphon Ponkam
Nopphon Ponkam
Nopphon Ponkam
Nopphon Ponkam
Nopphon Ponkam
Nopphon Ponkam
Southeast Asian Games medalists in football
Nopphon Ponkam
Competitors at the 2017 Southeast Asian Games